Anti-submarine mortars are artillery pieces deployed on ships for the purpose of sinking submarines by a direct hit with a small explosive charge. They are often larger versions of the mortar used by infantry and fire a projectile in relatively the same manner. They were created during World War II as a development of the depth charge and work on the same principle.

Beginnings

Anti-submarine warfare did not become an issue of great concern until World War I, when Germany used submarines in an attempt to strangle British shipping in the Atlantic Ocean and elsewhere. The earliest way to counter a submarine was in the form of depth charges, which were large canisters filled with explosives, rolled off the back of a ship and detonated by a hydrostatic fuse. Depth charges served well throughout World War I but were not without flaws. A ship had to pass directly over a submarine to score an effective hit, because of this depth charges were dropped in lines instead of more effective clusters and could only be carried in ships fast enough to avoid the concussion of the explosion. The depth charges were also not as effective as one might think at sinking a submarine - only a very close detonation would sink a submarine, and the problems of scoring a direct hit meant that a submarine was more often damaged then destroyed by depth charges.

These were a significant improvement over the old method, permitting the use of large 'patterns' of up to 10 depth charges from the throwers and stern depth charge rails used together. However they still required a ship to pass very close to a submarine, which entailed loss of sonar (ASDIC) contact during the final stages of the approach. Submarines could and did use this dead interval to take evasive action.

It was the British who developed the first anti-submarine mortars. Several versions appeared in 1917, most notably the BL 7.5 inch Naval Howitzer; however the anti-submarine mortar did not become a truly successful weapon until the advent of the multi-barrelled Hedgehog 25 years later.

WWII anti-submarine mortars

During World War II submarines once again posed a major threat to Allied shipping, which necessitated the development of more effective anti-submarine mortars. These all had the common characteristic of throwing multiple charges ahead of the attacking vessel, while it was still in sonar contact. The first was the famous Hedgehog, which consisted of 24 small mortar rounds, each one  in diameter and weighing 65 pounds with a 35-pound warhead. While the warhead on a Hedgehog was much smaller than that of a depth charge it scored three times as many kills than its predecessors. This was due to the use of a contact fuse on the projectile, which would only detonate on impact with a target. Since the projectile would only explode on a hit, the long periods of sonar "blackout" from the blast and turbulence of a conventional depth charge explosion were eliminated. In the later stages of World War II the Hedgehog was complemented in Britain by the Squid three-barrelled depth charge mortar, which fired 390-lb depth charges to a range of 250 metres, and in the US by the Mousetrap rockets.

Modern uses

The homing torpedo has largely replaced the anti-submarine mortar in naval combat, although several examples still exist. It remained in service with many British and Commonwealth navies until the 1980s. The Bofors anti-submarine rocket launcher was used until 1980 with the Swedish Navy. Due to the poor sonar conditions of the Baltic Sea, mortars, rocket and missile launchers still retain a place next to torpedoes. The former Soviet Navy (and by extension, the Russian Navy) is the largest user of anti-submarine mortars. Keeping with the Soviet idea that weapons should be simple, cheap and reliable, several versions of rocket-propelled anti-submarine mortars were developed. Trials were also conducted on destroying oncoming torpedoes with anti-submarine mortars. There was also a more extreme version, the nuclear RPK-1 Vikhr, though this is more technically an anti-submarine rocket. It had anti-surface and land-attack uses as well.

See also
 Mousetrap (weapon)

External links

Anti-submarine warfare
Anti-submarine weapons